Kawabeia is an East Palearctic genus of moths belonging to the subfamily Tortricinae of the family Tortricidae.

Species
Kawabeia fuscofasciata Park & Byun, 1991 Korea (Gwanglung)
Kawabeia ignavana (Christoph, 1881) East Siberia
Kawabeia nigricolor Yasuda & Kawabe, 1980 Japan
Kawabeia paraignavana Park & Byun, 1991 Korea (Gwanglung)
Kawabeia razowskii (Kawabe, 1963 ) Japan

See also
List of Tortricidae genera

References

External links
tortricidae.com

Tortricidae genera
Tortricinae